The Right Alliance was a centre-right conservative political party in Poland from 2001 to 2002.

The party was formed on 26 March 2001 from part of the Solidarity Electoral Action political coalition. It formed an electoral alliance with the Law and Justice party in the September 2001 election to the Sejm of the Republic of Poland.  It completed its merger into Law and Justice on 2 June 2002.

Famous politicians

 Michał Kamiński
 Piotr Krzywicki
 Kazimierz Marcinkiewicz
 Krzysztof Mikuła
 Jerzy Polaczek

 Paweł Przychodzeń
 Grzegorz Schreiber
 Wojciech Starzyński
 Mirosław Styczeń
 Maciej Wąsik

References

See also
Law and Justice
Kazimierz Ujazdowski

2001 establishments in Poland
2002 disestablishments in Poland
Conservative parties in Poland
Catholic political parties
Defunct political parties in Poland
Law and Justice
Political parties disestablished in 2002
Political parties established in 2001